Namskaket (also Naamskeket, Naemschatet, Namskeket, Naumskachett) was a Nauset village on or near Namskaket Creek in Barnstable County, Massachusetts, near the modern border between Brewster and Orleans.

Native Americans sold the site to English colonists in 1644.

It is now a village in Orleans.

References

 Frederick Webb Hodge, ed., Handbook of American Indians: North of Mexico, Smithsonian Institution, Bureau of American Ethnology, Bulletin 30, Part 2, 1910. at Google Books
 Bulletin of the United States Geological Survey 114, 1894. Google Books

Former populated places in Massachusetts
Pre-statehood history of Massachusetts
Populated coastal places in Massachusetts
Villages in Barnstable County, Massachusetts
Orleans, Massachusetts